The meridian gecko (Coleodactylus meridionalis) is a species of lizard in the family Sphaerodactylidae. The species is endemic to Brazil.

Geographic range
C. meridionalis has been recorded from the Brazilian states of Bahia, Ceará, Pará, Paraíba, Pernambuco, and Sergipe.

Description
The pupil of the eye is round.

Behavior
C. meridionalis is diurnal.

Reproduction
C. meridionalis is oviparous.

As prey
C. meridionalis is preyed upon by the spider Parabatinga brevipes.

References

Further reading
Boulenger GA (1888). "On some Reptiles and Batrachians from Iguarasse, Pernambuco". Annals and Magazine of Natural History, Eighth Series 2: 40–43. (Sphaerodactylus meridionalis, new species, pp. 40–41).
Parker HM (1926). "The Neotropical Lizards of the Genera Lepidoblepharis, Pseudogonatodes, Lanthrogecko, and Sphaerodactylus, with the Description of a new Genus". Ann. Mag. Nat. Hist., Ninth Series 17: 291–301. (Coleodactylus meridionalis, new combination, p. 300).

Coleodactylus
Reptiles described in 1888